White Bear (also known as , died 1870) was a Temagami First Nation chief.

He was the grandfather of Ignace Tonené. Both White Bear Lake and White Bear Forest were named after him.

Family life 
White Bear and his wife Mrs White Bear had a son François Kabimigwune (died 1880). François Kabimigwune's son (and White Bear's grandson) was Ignace Tonené and was born in 1840 or 41, and died in 1916.

He was a trader in furs and in 1858 he supplied the Hudson's Bay Company with seed potatoes.

Temagami leadership 
White Bear was the chief of Temagami First Nation when white settlers arrived in Canada.

He lived on the northwest shore of White Bear Lake (now Cassels Lake), which was named after him.

Death and legacy 
White Bear died in 1870.

White Bear Forest is named after White Bear.

See also 

 Bear Island (Lake Temagami)

References 

1870s deaths
Indigenous leaders in Ontario
People from Temagami
History of Temagami
Canadian fur traders
Upper Canada people